Sala Daeng Subdistrict may refer to the following subdistricts (tambon) of Thailand:
Sala Daeng Subdistrict in Bang Nam Priao District, Cha Choeng Sao Province
Sala Daeng Subdistrict in Krok Phra District, Nakhon Sawan Province
Sala Daeng Subdistrict in Mueang Ang Thong District